Sayan may refer to the following people
Given name
Sayan Ghosh (born 1992), Indian cricketer
Sayan Mondal (born 1989), Indian cricketer
Sayan Roy (born 1991), Indian football player
Sayan Paratanavong (born 1951), Thai sprinter.

Surname
Diego García Sayán (born 1950), Peruvian judge
Lévon Sayan (born 1934), French-Armenian impresario, producer and operatic tenor
Seda Sayan (born 1961), Turkish pop folk singer, actress and TV variety-show hostess